Saku is a masculine Finnish given name. Notable people with the name include:

Saku Kinnunen (born 1995), Finnish ice hockey player
Saku Koivu (born 1974), Finnish ice hockey player
Saku Mäenalanen (born 1994), Finnish ice hockey player
Saku Pesonen (born 1985), Finnish footballer
Saku Puhakainen (born 1975), Finnish footballer
Saku Salmela (born 1990), Finnish ice hockey player
Saku Salminen (born 1994), Finnish ice hockey player
Saku Savolainen (born 1996), Finnish footballer

Saku (written: 佐久) is also a feminine Japanese given name. Notable people with the name include:

, concubine of the Aizu lord Matsudaira Katamori

Saku is also a Sesotho masculine given name. Notable people with the name include:
Saku Nkoli Saku (born mid 1800s), one of the first settlers of Ha-Khobotle, Lesotho.
Mpota Saku (born 1908), Mosotho second world war veteran.

Finnish masculine given names
Japanese feminine given names